"Grace" is a song by Mumford & Sons frontman Marcus Mumford, released as the second single from his solo debut album Self-Titled on 29 July 2022. The song features vocalist Danielle Ponder and bassist Pino Paladino, and was co-written by Mumford and producer Blake Mills.

Style and reception 
Mxdwn.com's Alexandra Kozicki called the song "quite soulful, with Mumford's gravelly voice accompanied by [Danielle] Ponder's backing vocals" with production which is "softer than what Mumford and Sons are known for, employing light percussion and acoustic instruments", though the songwriting is "at its finest ... in the form of him clearly expressing some catharsis and the deep tension in his voice during the chorus. There is a lot of pain in this song, but also some hope and, as the title suggests, grace." NMEs Tom Skinner called the song "rough-and-ready" and "country-tinged". Our Culture Mags Gerda Krivaite described "Grace" as being "infused with a comforting folk-rock vibrancy". The Arts Desks Barney Harsent notes the track standing in contrast to lead single "Cannibal", with that song's "sparse, open spaces of its predecessor" being succeeded by one that "bursts into life like Tom Petty gatecrashing a therapy session" and is "unexpectedly and defiantly upbeat, the sound of a weight being lifted."

The Independents Helen Brown says the song's "cradle-rocked riff evokes a hushed take on Tom Petty's "Free Fallin'", while NMEs Elizabeth Aubrey says the song is "full of zippy guitars and uplifting instrumentation." Riffs Roman Gokhman notes that the "main guitar riff has more electric grit than Mumford & Sons, while a guitar solo distances it from the Americana sound for which Mumford is best known. It sounds more like Collective Soul." In a less positive review of the album, DIYs Emma Swann calls the track "a confused mess of US radio rock tropes: a blues guitar solo bulldozing its way through while Marcus adopts a Transatlantic twang for the hollow refrain of 'Grace/Like a river'". Per Mumford, the song is about a conversation he had with his mother about his having been sexually abused as a child.

Music video 
The single was released alongside a music video directed by Diane Martel, and features Mumford drinking several glasses of water to the point where he coughs it up and it spills all over himself. Per Kozicki, "Though the sound of the song is mellow in tempo, there is a much more soulful and active undertone to the video, which mirrors the feeling of the track."

Live performances 
Mumford performed the song with a live band on The Late Late Show with James Corden on October 4, 2022.

Personnel 
 Marcus Mumford – vocals, guitar, percussion, songwriting
 Blake Mills – producer, songwriting, guitar, harmonium, piano, percussion, synth bass, vocals, mixing engineer
 Joseph Lorge – mixing engineer, baritone guitar
 Pino Palladino – bass
 Steve Ferrone – drums
 Reuben James – organ
 Rob Moose – strings
 Danielle Ponder – vocals
 Gavin Batty – vocals
 Patricia Sullivan – mastering engineer
 Danielle Goldsmith, Gabe Lowry, Logan Taylor, and Scott Moore – assistant recording engineers

References

2022 singles
2022 songs
Marcus Mumford songs
Songs written by Blake Mills
Songs written by Marcus Mumford
Songs about child abuse